London School of University Studies is a South African educational institution that was established in 1993, with over 1700 students since inception. London School is an independent educational institution providing tuition for Degrees awarded by the University of London's External System.

Ranking

External links
Official Site

Education in Gauteng
Educational institutions established in 1993
1993 establishments in South Africa